Anolis peucephilus is a species of lizard in the family Dactyloidae. The species is found in Mexico.

References

Anoles
Reptiles described in 2014
Endemic reptiles of Mexico
Taxa named by Gunther Köhler